Olubunmi Felix Owoso (October 23, 1949June 28, 2020) was a former Rector, Yaba College of Technology (YABATECH) and Secretary-General of the Commonwealth Association of Technical Universities and Polytechnics in Africa (CAPA).

Early life and education
Olubunmi Owoso was born on October 23, 1949  in Osun State, Nigeria. He graduated from the University of Ibadan in 1972 with a B.Sc. (Hons) in Agriculture. He obtained an M.Sc. in Food Technology (1981) from University of Reading, UK and an M.Sc. in Development Studies (1995) from London South Bank University. In 2013, he obtained his Ph.D. in Management Science from  the Ladoke Akintola University of Technology, Ogbomoso, Nigeria.

Career
Olubunmi Owoso served as Head of the Department of Food Technology at Kaduna Polytechnic from October, 1981 to September, 1985. He served as a visiting lecturer at the Department of Biotechnology, South Bank Polytechnic UK, (now, London South Bank University) from January 1992 to June 1993. From 2001-2009 he was the Rector of Yaba College of Technology (YABATECH). He was also the Head of the Department of Food Technology and the National President of the Polytechnic Staff Association of Nigeria (POSSAN). He was appointed the Secretary General of Commonwealth Association of Technical Universities and Polytechnics (CAPA) based in Nairobi, Kenya in 2012.

He was credited with the establishment of the Centre for Entrepreneurship Development, Internal Quality Assurance Unit; Centre for Applied Research and Technology Innovation, a new satellite campus of the Yaba College of Technology (YABATECH) in Epe, Lagos State.

References

Nigerian educational theorists
1949 births
People from Ogun State
Obafemi Awolowo University alumni
Academic staff of the University of Lagos
2020 deaths
The Polytechnic, Ibadan alumni
University of Ibadan alumni
Alumni of the University of Reading
Alumni of London South Bank University
Ladoke Akintola University of Technology alumni